The Midland Railway 2000 Class was a class of 40 0-6-4T steam locomotives designed by Richard Deeley. They were known as "flatirons" or "hole-in-the-wall tanks" because of their distinctive shape; their side tanks extended to the front of the smokebox and they had a distinct cut-out in the side tanks to access the motion. They were numbered 2000–2039.

Development
They were originally developed from 0-4-4T types designed for commuter work with an extra set of driving wheels. Acceleration and stability, however, were poor and, after a derailment, they were relegated to freight work. All were rebuilt with Belpaire firebox and superheater between 1920 and 1926. The superheated engines had slightly longer smokeboxes which extended slightly in front of the side tanks.

Ownership change
The locomotives passed to the London, Midland and Scottish Railway (LMS) in 1923. They kept their Midland Railway numbers and the LMS gave them the power classification 3P.

Accidents and incidents
The class were rough riders at speed. They were liable to oscillate on poor track, which led to a number of derailments.
In June 1928, locomotive No. 2015 was hauling a mail train that was derailed at Swinderby, Lincolnshire.
In August 1928, locomotive No. 2029 was hauling a train that was derailed at Ashton under Hill, Worcestershire.
On 25 February 1935, locomotive No. 2023 was hauling a passenger train that was derailed at Ashton under Hill. One person was killed.
In 1935, locomotive No. 2011 was hauling a train that was derailed at Moira, Leicestershire.

Withdrawal
All were withdrawn between 1935 and 1938. The standard parts would have mostly been used for spares rather than scrap. None were preserved.

References
Notes

Bibliography

External links 
 Midland Railway Society photo of an unsuperheated flatiron No. 2031
 a photograph of a superheated flatiron No. 2000
 

2000 Class
0-6-4T locomotives
Railway locomotives introduced in 1907
Standard gauge steam locomotives of Great Britain
C2′ n2t locomotives